Villequier is a former commune in the Seine-Maritime department in the Normandy region in northern France. On 1 January 2016, it was merged into the new commune of Rives-en-Seine.

Geography

Heraldry

Population

Places of interest

 The church of St. Pierre, dating from the sixteenth century.
 The church of St. Martin, dating from the twelfth century.
 The fifteenth-century chateau of Ételan, with its park and a dovecote.
 Medieval fortifications at La Guerche.
 Three seventeenth-century manorhouses.
 An eighteenth-century presbytery.
 The chapel of Barre-Y-Va.
 The Victor Hugo museum.
 The Hugo family tombs in the cemetery.

People
Victor Hugo (1802–1895), dramatist, spent much time here with his friends and family. His daughter Léopoldine Hugo drowned in Villequier in 1843.
Auguste Vacquerie (1819–1895), poet and journalist, was born here and is buried here.

See also
Communes of the Seine-Maritime department

References

Former communes of Seine-Maritime